Urukondapeta, (Urkondapet) belongs to  Nagarkurnool district, Urkonda Mandal.

Urukondapeta (Urkondapeta)

Urkondapeta is a village located nearby Kalwakurthy. It belongs to Urkonda mandal, Jadcherla (Assembly constituency) in Nagarkurnool district of Telangana's new state in India. This is located 12 kilometers from Kalwakurthy. It has approximately 2600 population. It is a big village compared to surrounding villages.
In this village lot of general stores are there and available all items without any fail

Places of interest
In this village there is a temple called Sri Abhayaanjaneya Swamy temple. 
Every Saturday, many pilgrims visit this temple from surrounding areas.
In the month of January or February there are fairs in the village.

Devaalayam (Sri Abhayaanjaneya Swamy temple)

About temple every Saturday pilgrims come there. Peaceful and nice place for visiting. Every year they celebrate Annual Celebrations here (JATHARA)Many pilgrims visit at the time.

Transportation
It has two routes from Kalwakurthy:

1. From Kalwakurthy Bus stand Bus names called Gatippalapaly/Talakondapally will go via Urkondapeta or can get Direct Auto's from Kalwakurthy Bus stand.
Bus Timing
         Ukpt-klky.  6:00AM.       
         Klky-ukpt.  6:30AM.      
Next.
         Klky-ukpt.  8:30AM.     
         Ukpt-klky.  11:00AM.      
Next.
         Klky-ukpt.  2:00PM.      
         Ukpt-klky.  4:30PM.       
         Klky-ukpt.  5:20PM.       
         UKPT-KLKY.  6:30PM.       
LAST BUS.
         KLKY-UKPT.  7:20PM.      
DAILY SAME TIMINGS.

2. From Hyderabad IS Sadan Bus stop early morning in between 9:00 to 9:30 AM, 1:00 PM to 1:30 PM  and  6:00 PM to 7:00 PM we have buses to Urukondapeta Hanuman Temple and the same buses will return to Hyderabad

3. From Amangal we have buses to we have buses to Urukondapeta Hanuman Temple.

4. This is the alternative route from Kalwakurthy, get in the Mahabubnagar or Jadcherla buses and get down at a place name called Urkonda, from there it is 3 kilometers, on every Saturday you will find many auto rickshaws from Urkonda Gate

References

Villages in Nagarkurnool district
Nagarkurnool district
Temples in Telangana